James Hardy Dillard II (born November 21, 1933) is a politician and former Republican member of the Virginia House of Delegates. He represented the 41st district, which includes part of Fairfax County, from 1980 to his retirement in 2005.

In the years after leaving office, Dillard has strayed from the Republican Party; endorsing Mark Warner for the United States Senate in 2008; his Democratic successor as Delegate for the 41st district, Dave Marsden, on several occasions; and his defeated 1999 opponent for the Virginia House of Delegates, Democrat Eileen Filler-Corn, to replace Marsden in that seat in 2010. He also declared President George W. Bush's No Child Left Behind program to be a failure. Dillard, however, still claims to be a Republican.

References

External links
Delegate Biography for 2005
Historical biography on Virginia House of Delegates

Living people
1933 births
People from Fairfax County, Virginia
Republican Party members of the Virginia House of Delegates
Politicians from Charlottesville, Virginia
American University alumni
College of William & Mary alumni
Episcopalians from Virginia